

Associations
Association of Professional Schools of International Affairs (APSIA)
Global Studies Consortium
International Studies Association
The Jadavpur Association of International Relations
Swedish Association of International Affairs

Institutes
 Institute of Security and Global Affairs, Leiden University, Netherlands
 Institut Barcelona d'Estudis Internacionals (Catalonia, Spain)
 The European Institute for International Law and International Relations (Brussels)
 ISPI Istituto per gli Studi di Politica Internazionale (Italian Institute for International Political Studies), Milan, Italy
 Institute of World Politics (Washington, D.C.)
International Institute for Strategic Studies (IISS), UK 
The Australian Institute of International Affairs (Deakin, ACT, Australia)
The Canadian Institute of International Affairs, Toronto, ON, Canada
The Finnish Institute of International Affairs
The Nigerian Institute of International Affairs
The Norwegian Institute of International Affairs
The New Zealand Institute of International Affairs, Wellington, New Zealand
The Pakistan Institute of International Affairs, (PIIA) Karachi, Pakistan
The Royal Institute of International Affairs, Chatham House, London, United Kingdom
Geneva School of Diplomacy and International Relations, Geneva, Switzerland
Graduate Institute of International and Development Studies, Geneva, Switzerland
International Strategic Research Organization (ISRO/USAK)
 EGMONT - The Royal Institute for International Relations, Brussels, Belgium
University of Florida International Center
 Center for International Affairs, Jahangirnagar University, Savar, Dhaka, Bangladesh.
 South American Institute for Policy and Strategy Porto Alegre, Brazil
 Politics, Administration & International Relations at Zeppelin University, Germany
University of Guadalajara located in Guadalajara, Mexico
 Department of International Studies (Centro Universitario de Ciencias Sociales y Humanidades) 
 Department of Asia-Pacific Studies (Centro Universitario de Ciencias Sociales y Humanidades) 
Department of Latin American Studies (Centro Universitario de Ciencias Sociales y Humanidades)

Networks and think tanks
 Henry Jackson Society - Cambridge and London based think tank.